Davudlu is a village in the Qubadli District of Azerbaijan.

References 

Populated places in Qubadli District